FELDA Besout is a settlement town in Perak, Malaysia. This FELDA settlement is located about 28 km from Sungkai town.

List of settlements
FELDA Besout 1
FELDA Besout 2
FELDA Besout 3
FELDA Besout 4
FELDA Besout 5

Federal Land Development Authority settlements
Towns in Perak